The Santos Manuel Student Union is a student union located near the geographical the center of California State University, San Bernardino's campus, just east of John M Pfau Library. The Santos Manuel Student Union leads into the heart of the CSUSB campus and is located near many buildings, including University Hall, the College of Education, the Student Health Center, and the Serrano Village dormitories in addition to being close to administrative services.

Student Union 
 
The Student Union offers a variety of services, places, and spaces geared to the needs of students including restaurants, meeting rooms, an arcade and various student organizations.

See also 
 California State University, San Bernardino
 Student activity center

References

External links 
 Student Centers
 Food Court

California State University, San Bernardino
Student activity centers in the United States
Buildings and structures in San Bernardino, California
California State University auxiliary organizations